CX-3 or CX3 may refer to:

 Mazda CX-3, a subcompact crossover SUV model
 Korg CX-3, a clonewheel organ music instrument model
Clariion CX3 series, a series SAN disk arrays

See also 

 3CX